The Family is a 2001 novel written by Mario Puzo. The novel is about Pope Alexander VI and his family. Puzo spent over twenty years working on the book off and on, while he wrote others. The novel was finished by his longtime girlfriend, Carol Gino. The Family is effectively his last novel.

Plot introduction
Many of its characters were real people, including Niccolò Machiavelli, Duarte Brandão and members of the Borgia family.

Summary
Pope Alexander VI (formerly Rodrigo Borgia) believes God will ultimately forgive his many sins simply because, as pope, he is infallible and divine. The Family focuses on this cunning, ambitious despot and his children—the ruthless Cesare and the beautiful but wicked Lucrezia.

A passionate love story runs through the novel, but it is a sinful one. Lucrezia lost her virginity to her brother Cesare when she was only thirteen, and the two have loved only each other ever since. Alexander marries Lucrezia off three times for political reasons, to Giovanni Sforza (Lord of Pesaro), Alfonso of Aragon (Duke of Bisceglie), and finally Alfonso I d'Este (Duke of Ferrara). She remains submissive to her father, if not to her many husbands and lovers. Her final marriage, to Alfonso d'Este, was a success, though neither partner was faithful: she bore her third husband a number of children and proved to be a respectable and accomplished duchess, effectively rising above her previous reputation and surviving the fall of the Borgias following her father's death.

Pope Alexander aims to unify Italy's feudal states under papal rule. Cesare, who exchanges his cardinal's miter for a warrior's helmet to become commander-in-chief of his father's armies, carries out conquest after conquest to fulfill Alexander's grandiose ambitions. As in Puzo's The Godfather, the lovemaking, the opulent festivities, the sub rosa plotting, and the complex double-dealing are interspersed with outbursts of violence, including one memorable scene in which the reformist priest Girolamo Savonarola is torn apart on the Rack.

References

2001 American novels
Novels by Mario Puzo
Novels set in the Middle Ages
Novels set in the Renaissance
Cultural depictions of Cesare Borgia
Cultural depictions of Lucrezia Borgia
Cultural depictions of Pope Alexander VI
Cultural depictions of Niccolò Machiavelli
Cultural depictions of Girolamo Savonarola
Novels published posthumously
ReganBooks books